Halice may refer to:
 Halych, a historic city in Ukraine
 Halice (Argolis), a town of ancient Argolis, Greece
 Halice (genus), a genus of prehistoric mollusc